Blades of Glory is a 2007 American sports comedy film directed by Will Speck and Josh Gordon, written by Jeff Cox, Craig Cox, John Altschuler and Dave Krinsky, and starring Will Ferrell and Jon Heder with Will Arnett, Amy Poehler, William Fichtner, Jenna Fischer and Craig T. Nelson in supporting roles. It tells the story of a mismatched pair of banned figure skaters who become teammates upon discovering a loophole that will allow them to compete in the sport again. The film's story was conceived by Busy Philipps, who "fleshed out the screenplay". However, co-writers Jeff and Craig Cox dropped her name from the script. The film was produced by DreamWorks Pictures, MTV Films, Red Hour Films and Smart Entertainment and released on March 30, 2007, by Paramount Pictures. The film was met with positive reviews.

Plot
Chazz Michael Michaels is a skillful single skater but raunchy sex addict. Jimmy MacElroy is an equally talented and effeminate but sheltered skater. From the start, the two rival skaters are clear polar opposites with different backgrounds. Chazz grew up on the streets and is a self-taught skater, while Jimmy was adopted by Darren MacElroy, a wealthy man who adopts and manages children showing exceptional athletic ability.

At the 2002 World Winter Sport Games, Chazz and Jimmy tie for gold. Darren immediately fires Jimmy's coach Darren Goddard over this. While standing on the awards podium after both skaters tie for gold, the two start arguing which then escalates into a fight and ends with the World Games mascot being accidentally set on fire. As a result, Commissioner Ebbers of the National Figure Skating Association, despite their best defenses (Jimmy profusely and genuinely apologizing for his role, Chazz merely defending himself by picking up a sports magazine that declared, as did he, that "Chazz Michael Michaels IS ice skating"), strips both men of their medals and bans them from competitive skating for life. On the drive home, Darren immediately "unadopts" Jimmy and leaves him by the side of the road.

Three and a half years later, both men have grudgingly taken on alternative occupations.  Chazz performs as the wizard in a children's ice show, badly, as he's always drunk (to the point he is fired when his drunken vomiting forces a show to be scrapped midway through). Jimmy is working at a sporting goods store, and one day is visited by Hector, his obsessive stalker. Hector tells him of a loophole in the ban: he's only banned from competing in men's singles skating, allowing him to compete in pair skating. 

In hopes of entering the upcoming World Winter Sport Games, Jimmy contacts Coach Goddard. When Jimmy goes to the local ice arena to put up an ad for a pairs partner, he runs into the just-fired Chazz. The two men start a fight at the ice show which gets them both arrested. As Coach Goddard watches video of their fight on the news, he gets an idea. He then visits them in jail to convince them to skate as the first-ever male-male pairs team.

Coach Goddard puts them up in his cabin, and gets a secret rink for them to practice in. They hate-skate in practice, but Coach Goddard tells them they need to learn to get along to skate together. After a rough start—and an audience that doesn't know what to think of the pair—Jimmy and Chazz perform well at the Winter Sports Games qualifiers, worrying brother and sister competitors Stranz and Fairchild Van Waldenberg. They guilt their sister Katie into secretly filming the duo as they practice. Jimmy and Katie awkwardly flirt with each other and Chazz coaches Jimmy on how to ask her out. 
They go on a date and are clearly smitten. However, her elder siblings now want Katie to seduce Chazz to make Jimmy jealous. When she refuses, they threaten to harm Jimmy.  

Coach Goddard tells Jimmy and Chazz they need to use a move that will wow the judges: the "Iron Lotus", an extremely complicated and dangerous maneuver that he had developed years ago. The only attempt of the maneuver was in North Korea, and resulted in the man decapitating the woman with his skate blade. Goddard is convinced that the move only failed because it should have been two men performing it. 

Katie attends Chazz's sex addicts meeting, pretending to be a member, and then invites Chazz to her room and tries to seduce him. Chazz refuses out of respect for Jimmy, which delights Katie. But Chazz can't resist grabbing her breasts. Jimmy arrives and witnesses this, and is outraged at their betrayals. Jimmy runs off, and Chazz attempts numerous times to apologize to Jimmy by voicemail.

In an attempt to sabotage the performance the following day, Stranz and Fairchild kidnap both Chazz and Jimmy. Chazz escapes while Stranz is changing into his costume. He skates on the waterways all the way to the arena, with Stranz in hot pursuit. 

As Fairchild is restraining Jimmy in the bathroom at the arena, she reveals to him that she and her brother commanded Katie to have sex with Chazz to make him jealous, and that he didn't go through with it out of respect for him. Jimmy, overjoyed at this news, escapes as well. 

Chazz and Jimmy arrive at the ice rink just in time to compete, where they reconcile quickly and begin their routine. Fairchild, angry that the pair is doing well, breaks her necklace and throws a pearl onto the ice. Chazz skates over it and breaks his ankle, rendering him unable to perform his role in the Iron Lotus. Jimmy then offers to switch places with him. Although they have never practiced the other's roles, they perform it perfectly, and win the competition.

Jimmy reconciles with Katie, and the two pursue a relationship. Stranz and Fairchild are arrested for the foul play and desecrating a Canadian mascot. They begin arguing, then kissing each other incestuously before being handcuffed by the Royal Canadian Mounted Police. Jimmy and Chazz receive the gold medal and fly off into the sky via rockets on their skates.

Cast

Production
The film was based on Busy Philipps' idea and she worked on the screenplay. However, in an oral history about the movie for Nerdist, Craig Cox fully attributed the idea of Blades of Glory to his brother, Jeff Cox. The oral history has since been updated with information about Philipps' contributions. Phillips discussed the incident in her memoir, This Will Only Hurt A Little, stating that she should be credited as a co-writer in the credits and that she had registered the idea with the Writers Guild of America West at its inception, having come up with the concepteven suggesting Ferrell as one of the two co-leads (alongside Ben Stiller)while she and then-boyfriend Craig were watching television together when he visited her in Vancouver, during production of White Chicks. Seth Rogen has also said that he and his writing partner Evan Goldberg wrote a draft of the screenplay that included some of the "biggest jokes" featured in the finished movie, but they were ultimately fired and did not receive any credit.

All of the scenes at the National Figure Skating Championships and World Wintersport Games were shot at the Los Angeles Memorial Sports Arena. The stadium used for the outside shoots is the Montreal Olympic Stadium, built for the 1976 Olympics. The outdoor chase scenes were also shot on-location in Montreal. The building used for athlete housing in Montreal was the unique Habitat 67, built for Expo 67. The film was delayed for a small undetermined period of time when Jon Heder broke his ankle while doing a skating program for the film.

Reception

Box office
Blades of Glory grossed $118.2 million in the U.S. and Canada and $26.3 million in other territories, for a total of $145.7 million.

The film grossed $33 million on its opening weekend on March 30 – April 1, 2007, with 3,372 theaters, averaging $9,790 per screen, defeating Disney's Meet the Robinsons to become the number 1 film. It made $22.5 million in its second weekend, losing only 32% of its audience and retaining the Number 1 spot.

Critical response

Review aggregation website Rotten Tomatoes gave the film an approval rating of 70% based on 188 reviews, with an average rating of 6.3/10. The site's critical consensus reads, "Thanks to the spirited performances of a talented cast – particularly Will Ferrell and Jon Heder as rivals-turned-teammates – Blades of Glory successfully spoofs inspirational sports dramas with inspired abandon." On Metacritic the film has a weighted average score of 64 out of 100, based on 35 critics, indicating "generally favorable reviews". Audiences polled by CinemaScore gave the film an average grade of "B" on an A+ to F scale.

The Monthly critic Luke Davies accepted the film as a fun romp, comparing it to Will Ferrell's previous movies Anchorman: The Legend of Ron Burgundy and Talladega Nights: The Ballad of Ricky Bobby and wrote positively of Ferrell's performance, describing that "there is a parodic exhilaration to everything Ferrell does; there's always the sense that any scene is precariously close to being a blooper reel." However, Davies conceded that, like the other two films, the plot was "formulaic ... [with] an obviousness to the set-ups, a no-nonsense compression, a sometimes clunky transition from one sequence to the next" but that it was the film's ability to "venture to fantastically absurd places – to set aside the rapid and hokey forward movement – and there to idle in neutral, in zones of pure comic exploration" and offer "moments of expansive hilarity ... that made the films worthwhile."

Home media
The film was released on DVD and HD DVD on August 28, 2007, and released on Blu-ray Disc on May 20, 2008.

References
 Citations

 General references

External links

 
 
 
 
 

2007 films
2000s sports comedy films
2000s English-language films
Figure skating films
Films shot in Montreal
American buddy comedy films
American sports comedy films
Incest in film
Films set in Colorado
DreamWorks Pictures films
MTV Films films
Paramount Pictures films
Films directed by Will Speck and Josh Gordon
Films produced by Ben Stiller
Red Hour Productions films
Films scored by Theodore Shapiro
2007 directorial debut films
2007 comedy films
2000s buddy comedy films
2000s American films